Sigmund Esco "Jackie" Jackson (born May 4, 1951) is an American singer best known as a founding member of the Jackson 5, for which he was inducted into the Rock and Roll Hall of Fame in 1997. Jackson is the second child of the Jackson family, and the oldest Jackson brother.

Early life
Sigmund Esco Jackson was born at St Mary's Mercy Hospital in Gary, Indiana, on his mother Katherine's 21st birthday in 1951. He was given the nickname Jackie by his grandfather, Samuel Jackson. He and his siblings (Michael, Marlon, Tito, Jermaine, Randy, Rebbie, La Toya, and Janet) were brought up in a two-bedroom house in Gary, Indiana, an industrial steel city south of Chicago. His father, Joseph "Joe" Jackson, worked at a steel mill, and at night he played in an R&B band called the Falcons with his brother, Luther. Their mother, Katherine, a Jehovah's Witness, played the clarinet and piano. His father formed the Jackson Brothers singing group, which included Jackie and his brothers Tito and Jermaine. Younger brothers Marlon and Michael played assorted percussive instruments.

By 1964, Joe made Michael the lead singer forming the Jackson 5, after Katherine discovered that Michael could sing. The brothers rehearsed every day after school under Joe’s lead, keeping themselves busy and out of trouble. Joe saw that their talent could get them out of Gary. Jackie gives his mother credit saying "there wouldn't have been The Jackson 5 without her". Katherine used to sing harmonies with the brothers. Within two years, the group emerged professionally, signing with Motown in 1968. Before the group signed with Motown, Jackie wanted to pursue a career in professional baseball.

Career

The Jackson 5

Jackie performed with a high tenor singing voice. He had the highest and lightest natural speaking and singing voice of all the brothers. He added brief lead parts in some of the Jackson 5's hit singles, including "I Want You Back" and "ABC". When the Jackson 5 became the Jacksons after leaving Motown for CBS Records in 1976, Jackson's role as a vocalist and songwriter increased. He added a lead vocal alongside Michael on their Top 10 Epic single "Enjoy Yourself", and also added composition on six of the group's albums with Epic. Jackson's voice changed to a lower tenor vocal style during the Epic years. One of his most successful compositions, "Can You Feel It", co-written with Michael, became an international hit in 1981. Jackson began performing more lead vocals as Michael pursued a solo career. On their 1984 album Victory, Jackie performed lead on the song "Wait" and wrote the single "Torture". Before the start of the Victory Tour in 1984, he suffered a knee injury during rehearsals.  Jackie recovered well enough to perform on the last leg of shows in December 1984 in Los Angeles, where Michael announced he was leaving the group. In early 1985, Marlon left the group as well. Jackie, Tito and Randy became session musicians, vocalists and producers during this time.

In 1987, Jackie, Randy, Tito and Jermaine reunited and recorded "Time Out for the Burglar", the theme song for the film Burglar. The single was a minor R&B hit in the US, but had more success in Belgium where it peaked in the Top 40 at #17 for two consecutive weeks. The Jacksons also contributed backing vocals to the Tito-produced title track of Tramaine Hawkins's 1987 album Freedom. In late 1988, the Jacksons set out to record their final album, 2300 Jackson Street, on which Jackie and Jermaine split leads on the songs. 2300 Jackson Street failed to chart, despite the Randy and Jermaine-led hit "Nothin' (That Compares 2 U)". Randy did not participate in much of the album's promotion as he was working on his solo project, leaving Jackie, Tito and Jermaine to promote the album mostly overseas. Afterward, each brother went into solo projects. In 2001, after years out of the limelight, Jackie and his brothers gave a reunion performance with Michael during his 30th-anniversary special at Madison Square Garden

Solo career 
In 1973, Jackie released his first solo album Jackie Jackson. Jackie signed with Polydor, and released his first solo album in 16 years, Be the One, in late 1989. The album was a minor hit, charting at #89 on the R&B charts. The first single, "Stay", was a Top 40 R&B hit while the second single, "Cruzin'", was a moderate success.

Later work
Later in 2002, residing in Las Vegas, Jackie founded and ran two record companies, Jesco Records and Futurist Entertainment. His son Sigmund, Jr., known as DEALZ, released a mixtape on Jesco in 2007. In 2009, Jackie, Tito, Jermaine and Marlon starred in the reality series The Jacksons: A Family Dynasty which Jackie executive produced. In 2012, the quartet began their first tour since "Victory" in 1984. In 2017, Jackie signed EDM meets Hip-Hop musical duo "Gold Lemonade" consisting of France born DJ/producer Lya Lewis and Caribbean rooted front-man Jvgg Spvrrow to his label Critically Amused, after having met Lya in Las Vegas in 2015. Jackie also signed artist  D.B.L., a long time friend of The Jackson family.

Personal life

Family
Jackie has been married three times and has four children. He married his first wife, Enid Arden Spann (1954 - 1997), in November 1974 after a 5-year courtship. They separated in 1984 and Enid filed for divorce, but they reconciled in 1985. In January 1986, Enid filed for divorce for the final time. She received a restraining order against Jackson after alleging that he was physically abusive. Enid died from a brain aneurysm in 1997. They had two children:

 Sigmund Esco "Siggy" Jackson Jr. (June 29, 1977). Siggy married Toyia Parker on September 23, 2007. They have four children: Jared (born 2011), Kai-Ari (born 2014), Skyy (born 2018), and Anai (born 2020). Siggy rides motorcycles and fixes cars, and works within real estate. Siggy has also defended his family and his uncle Michael Jackson saying, "lies run sprints, but the truth runs marathons" He continues saying, "monetary gain and attention are driving forces behind it" in a KPWR interview in 2019.
 Brandi Jackson (February 6, 1982), In a 2019 Billboard interview, Brandi alleged that the renewed allegations against her uncle Michael Jackson are racially motivated by saying, "when you look at the entire situation, and you start to break it down, it's because he was a strong, influential black man." Brandi also spoke about her relationship with Wade Robson, and challenged his allegations against Michael. Brandi reveals that she had an over seven-year relationship with Robson and that she was often with him at Neverland when his alleged claims of abuse  took place. Brandi now works as a freelance photographer.

In the 1980s, Jackie was the subject of media coverage when he had an affair with pop star Paula Abdul. From 1989 to 1991, he dated actress Lela Rochon.

In 2001, Jackie married his second wife, Victoria Triggs. They later divorced. Jackson married his third wife, Emily Besselink, in 2012, who gave birth to twin boys, Jaylen and River Jackson, on December 31, 2013.

Michael's memorial
On July 7, 2009, at Michael Jackson's memorial at the Staples Center, the Jackson brothers, Jackie, Tito, Marlon, Jermaine and Randy each wore a gold necktie, a single white glove and sunglasses while they served as pallbearers honoring Michael. Jackie spoke out about the allegations against Michael saying "I knew my brother, he wasn't like that. His mission was helping children, helping people around the world." The family says Michael was an easy target, made easier now because the American legal system has no law protecting the deceased against slander, USA Today reported, February 27, 2019.

Discography

Studio albums

Singles

As main artist

As a featured artist

References

External links

1951 births
20th-century American drummers
20th-century American singers
21st-century American drummers
21st-century American singers
African-American male singers
African-American songwriters
American funk singers
American male drummers
American male pop singers
American male singers
American multi-instrumentalists
American people who self-identify as being of Native American descent
American rhythm and blues musicians
American rhythm and blues singers
American soul musicians
American soul singers
American tenors
Child pop musicians
Epic Records artists
Jackson family (show business)
Living people
Motown artists
Musicians from Gary, Indiana
Singers from Indiana
Songwriters from Indiana
Tambourine players
The Jackson 5 members